Veeravalli railway station (station code:VRVL) is an Indian Railways station in Veeravalli village of Andhra Pradesh. It lies on the Vijayawada–Nidadavolu loop line of Howrah–Chennai main line and is administered under Vijayawada railway division of South Central Railway zone. It halts for 8 trains every day.

History
The southern part of the East Coast State Railway (from Waltair to Vijayawada) was taken over by Madras Railway in 1901.

Electrification
The Mustabad–Gannavaram–Nuzvid–Bhimadolu sector was electrified in 1995–96.

References

External links
South Central Railway

Railway stations in Krishna district
Vijayawada railway division
1893 establishments in India